Assam Rifles Sports Club is a football section which represents Assam Rifles, one of the paramilitary forces of India. The team regularly participates in the prestigious Durand Cup, Bordoloi Trophy and various other regional football tournaments.

Honours

League
Assam State Premier League
 Champions (3): 2008–09, 2009–10, 2010–11
 Runners-up (1): 2011–12
Assam Club Championship 
 Champions (2): 1999, 2000

Cup
Bordoloi Trophy
 Winners (1): 1964
 Runners-up (5): 1960, 1961, 1982, 1987, 2012
Independence Day Cup
 Winners (4): 1981, 2010, 2013, 2017
 Runners-up (2): 2012, 2022
A.T.P.A. Shield
 Winners (3): 1966, 2007, 2008
Bodousa Cup
 Winners (1)
Amba Medhi Football Tournament
 Winners (4): 1994, 2000, 2007, 2008
Churachand Singh Trophy
 Winners (9): 1950, 1952, 1954, 1957, 1959, 1968, 1969, 1979, 2008
 Runners-up (1): 1960
Sohanlal Dugar Shield
 Winners (2): 2014, 2015
 Runners-up (2): 1999, 2001

References

Military association football clubs in India
Football clubs in Assam